Committee on European Affairs may refer to:

 Committee on European Affairs (Bulgaria)
 Committee on European Affairs (France)